Golden Rule Airlines was a charter airline based in Bishkek, Kyrgyzstan. It ceased operations in 2011.

History
The airline was established in 2003.

On October 12, 2006, the airline was added to the list of air carriers banned in the European Union.

On February 22, 2009, one of its aircraft, carrying cargo and crew, was damaged beyond repair after it crashed in a field due to loss of engine power. There were no fatalities.

Fleet
The fleet consisted of 3 Antonov An-2 biplanes.

References

Defunct airlines of Kyrgyzstan
Airlines established in 2003
Airlines formerly banned in the European Union
2003 establishments in Kyrgyzstan
2011 disestablishments in Kyrgyzstan